C.D. Luis Angel Firpo has had  many coaches in its history.

The majority of coaches Firpo have had have been Salvadorians. Of the coaches to have managed Firpo, 14 have been Spaniards and 17 foreigners.  In some cases, the Spanish coaches have been former players of the club that agreed to take charge after the sacking of the regular coach that season.

The main nationalities of the coaches of Firpo barring Salvadorians have been Argentina (7 coaches), Chilean (3) and Yugoslavian (2).  The club has also had two Uruguayan coaches, a Brazilians, a Paraguayan, and a Peruvian.

Firpo's coaches
Information correct as of match played December 22, 2022. Only competitive matches are counted.

External links
  (details the champion winning coaches)
 

Managers